Gilleyville is an unincorporated community in Richland Parish, Louisiana, United States.

References

Unincorporated communities in Richland Parish, Louisiana
Unincorporated communities in Louisiana